Vida Mary Katie MacLean (4 November 1881–1 July 1970) was a New Zealand civilian and military nurse, hospital matron . She was born in Whangaehu, Wanganui, New Zealand on 4 November 1881.

References

1881 births
1970 deaths
New Zealand nurses
New Zealand military personnel
New Zealand women nurses